Staggia Senese is a village in Tuscany, central Italy, administratively a frazione of the comune of Poggibonsi, province of Siena. At the time of the 2001 census its population was 2,129.

Staggia Senese is about 25 km from Siena and 8 km from Poggibonsi.

References 

Frazioni of Poggibonsi